Senator Clark may refer to:

Members of the Northern Irish Senate
Sir George Clark, 1st Baronet (1861–1935), Northern Irish Senator from 1925 to 1935
Sir George Clark, 3rd Baronet (1914–1991), Northern Irish Senator from 1951 to 1969
William Moore Wallis Clark (1897–1971), Northern Irish Senator from 1946 to 1961

Members of the United States Senate
Bennett Champ Clark (1890–1954), U.S. Senator from Missouri from 1933 to 1945
Daniel Clark (New Hampshire politician) (1809–1891), U.S. Senator from New Hampshire from 1866 to 1891
David Worth Clark (1902–1955), U.S. Senator from Idaho from 1939 to 1945
Clarence D. Clark (1851–1930), U.S. Senator from Wyoming from 1895 to 1917
Dick Clark (senator) (born 1928), U.S. Senator from Iowa from 1973 to 1979
Joseph S. Clark Jr. (1901–1990), U.S. Senator from Pennsylvania from 1957 to 1969
William A. Clark (1839–1925), U.S. Senator from Montana from 1901 to 1907

United States state senate members
Alan Clark (Arkansas politician) (born 1960), Arkansas State Senate
Amos Clark Jr. (1828–1912), New Jersey State Senate
Ben Clark (politician) (fl, 2010s), North Carolina State Senate
Chase A. Clark (1883–1966), Idaho State Senate
Edward Clark (governor) (1815–1880), Texas State Senate
Eugene Clark (politician) (1850–1932), Wisconsin State Senate
Franklin Clark (1801–1874), Maine State Senate
Henry A. Clark (New York politician) (1818–1906), New York State Senate
Henry Alden Clark (1850–1944), Pennsylvania State Senate
Henry Toole Clark (1808–1874), North Carolina State Senate
J. Murray Clark (fl. 1990s–2010s), Indiana State Senate
James S. Clark (1921–2000), Alabama State Senate
James Clark (Kentucky politician) (1779–1839), Kentucky State Senate
James Clark Jr. (1918–2006), Maryland State Senate
Jim Clark (offensive lineman) (1929–2000), Hawaii State Senate
John Clark (Minnesota politician) (1825–1904), Minnesota State Senate
Joseph Clark (New York politician) (1787–1873), New York State Senate
Katherine Clark (born 1963), Massachusetts State Senate
Martha Fuller Clark (born 1942), New Hampshire State Senate
Merritt Clark (1803–1898), Vermont State Senate
Myron H. Clark (1806–1892), New York State Senate
Nancy Randall Clark (1938–2015), Maine State Senate
Orville Clark (1801–1862), New York State Senate
Perry B. Clark (born 1955), Kentucky State Senate
Satterlee Clark Jr. (1816–1881), Wisconsin State Senate
Tarryl Clark (born 1961), Minnesota State Senate
Ted D. Clark (1920–1980), Iowa State Senate
William G. Clark (1924–2001), Illinois State Senate
William Walter Clark (1885–1971), Wisconsin State Senate
William Clark (Montgomery County, NY) (1811–1885), New York State Senate
Wilson Hart Clark (1820–1887), Connecticut State Senate
Zenas Clark (1795–1864), New York State Senate

See also
Irma Clark-Coleman (born 1937), Michigan State Senate
Senator Clarke (disambiguation)